Otuke District is a district in Northern Uganda. Like many other Ugandan districts, Otuke district is named after its 'chief town', Otuke, where the district headquarters are located.

Location
Otuke District is bordered by Agago District to the north, Abim District to the northeast, Napak District to the east, Amuria District to the southeast, Alebtong District to the south, Lira District to the southwest and Pader District to the northwest. The coordinates of the district are:02 30N, 33 30E (Latitude:2.5000; Longitude:33.5000).

Overview
Otuke District was carved out of Lira District effective 1 July 2009. The district is administered by the Otuke District Administration, with headquarters at Otuke. The district is part of the Nine districts that make up Lango sub-region, which consists of the districts listed below. Lango sub-region was home to an estimated 1.5 million Langi, in 2002, according to the national census conducted that year.

Population
In 1991, the district population was estimated at about 43,500. The 2002 national census estimated the population of the district at approximately 62,000. In 2012, the population of Otuke District was estimated at 86,000.

See also
 Otuke
 Lango sub-region
 Districts of Uganda

References

External links
Otuke District Homepage
  Achon Rises From LRA Captivity To Become Otuke’s Son of Hope

 
Lango sub-region
Districts of Uganda
Northern Region, Uganda